John Wilkes (1725–1797) was an English radical and libertine in the 18th century.

John Wilkes may also refer to:
John Wilkes (banker), founder of the First National Bank of Charlotte
John Wilkes (printer) (1750–1810),  English printer, bookseller and stationer
John Wilkes (archaeologist) (born 1936), British archaeologist and academic
John E. Wilkes (1895–1957), vice admiral, U.S. Navy
John Vaughan Wilkes (1902–1986), English educationalist  and Anglican priest

See also
John Wilkes Booth (1838–1865), American actor, known for assassinating president Abraham Lincoln at Ford's Theatre in 1865
John Wilks (1776–1854), English Whig Party politician